Plainview is a city in Wabasha County, Minnesota, United States. The population was 3,340 at the 2010 census. The author Jon Hassler was raised in Plainview and some of the places in his writing are based on the town.

History
Plainview was platted in 1857. The city was named from its location on a plain at a lofty elevation, where a "plain view" can be had of the surrounding area. A post office has been in operation at Plainview since 1857. Plainview was incorporated in 1875.

Geography

Minnesota Highway 42, Minnesota Highway 247, and County Highway 4 are three of the main routes in the city.

Demographics

2010 census
As of the census of 2010, there were 3,340 people, 1,278 households, and 868 families living in the city. The racial makeup of the city was 94.9% White, 0.2% African American, 0.1% Native American, 0.3% Asian, 3.5% from other races, and 1.0% from two or more races. Hispanic or Latino of any race were 7.8% of the population.

There were 1,278 households, of which 36.5% had children under the age of 18 living with them, 53.1% were married couples living together, 10.4% had a female householder with no husband present, 4.5% had a male householder with no wife present, and 32.1% were non-families. 26.0% of all households were made up of individuals, and 13.8% had someone living alone who was 65 years of age or older. The average household size was 2.57 and the average family size was 3.13.

The median age in the city was 34.8 years. 27.5% of residents were under the age of 18; 7% were between the ages of 18 and 24; 28% were from 25 to 44; 22.4% were from 45 to 64; and 15.2% were 65 years of age or older. The gender makeup of the city was 48.1% male and 51.9% female.

2000 census
As of the census of 2000, there were 3,190 people, 1,157 households, and 824 families living in the city. The racial makeup of the city was 96.83% White, 0.03% African American, 0.06% Native American, 0.09% Asian, 2.45% from other races, and 0.53% from two or more races. Hispanic or Latino of any race were 5.14% of the population.

There were 1,157 households, out of which 39.8% had children under the age of 18 living with them, 58.8% were married couples living together, 9.2% had a female householder with no husband present, and 28.7% were non-families. 24.0% of all households were made up of individuals, and 13.0% had someone living alone who was 65 years of age or older.  The average household size was 2.65 and the average family size was 3.16.

In the city the population was spread out, with 29.3% under the age of 18, 8.6% from 18 to 24, 28.0% from 25 to 44, 17.9% from 45 to 64, and 16.2% who were 65 years of age or older.  The median age was 34 years. For every 100 females, there were 93.5 males.  For every 100 females age 18 and over, there were 90.0 males.

The median income for a household in the city was $39,952, and the median income for a family was $48,971. Males had a median income of $32,179 versus $22,754 for females. The per capita income for the city was $16,494.  About 5.5% of families and 6.4% of the population were below the poverty line, including 4.5% of those under age 18 and 12.4% of those age 65 or over.

Notable residents 
James A. Carley, Minnesota state legislator, Mayor of Plainview, and lawyer
Robert Rankin Dunlap, Minnesota state senator and lawyer
Slim Dunlap, born in Plainview, noted guitarist for The Replacements and other musical outlets.
Joseph Ray Watkins, was a citizen and an entrepreneur and founder of Watkins Incorporated.

References

External links

City of Plainview, MN -- Official site
Plainview MN Chamber of Commerce

Cities in Wabasha County, Minnesota
Rochester metropolitan area, Minnesota
Cities in Minnesota